Kari Juhani Sorri (born 25 October 1941) is a Finnish chess FIDE master (FM), International Correspondence Chess Grandmaster (1982), Finnish Chess Championship medalist (1972).

Biography
From the end of 1960s to the mid-1970s, Kari Juhani Sorri was one of Finland's leading chess players. In 1972, in Finnish Chess Championships he has won silver medal.

Kari Juhani Sorri played for Finland in the Chess Olympiad:
 In 1972, at fourth board in the 20th Chess Olympiad in Skopje (+7, =5, -2).

Kari Juhani Sorri played for Finland in the European Team Chess Championship preliminaries:
 In 1973, at fourth board in the 5th European Team Chess Championship preliminaries (+0, =2, -3).

Kari Juhani Sorri played for Finland in the World Student Team Chess Championships:
 In 1967, at second board in the 14th World Student Team Chess Championship in Harrachov (+4, =3, -4).

Kari Juhani Sorri played for Finland in the Nordic Chess Cup:
 In 1989, at fourth board in the 12th Nordic Chess Cup in Aabybro (+2, =1, -4).

In later years, Kari Juhani Sorri active participated in correspondence chess tournaments. He participated with Finland team in 10th Correspondence Chess Olympiad (1987–1995). In 1982 Kari Juhani Sorri won a tournament organized by the Finnish Correspondence Chess Federation. For this success he was awarded the title of ICCF Grandmaster.

References

External links
 
 
 
 

1941 births
Living people
Finnish chess players
Chess FIDE Masters
Correspondence chess grandmasters
Chess Olympiad competitors
20th-century chess players